Gela Shekiladze (born 14 September 1970) is a football coach and former football defender from Batumi, Georgia. He currently works as assistant coach for the Tajikistan national football team.

Career as a Football Player 

Between 1997 and 2002, Gela Shekiladze was capped 22 times for the national team. His club career began with eight seasons at Dinamo Batumi, where he was a first team regular. Successful highlights from his time in Dinamo Batumi include winning the Georgian Cup in 1998 as a result of defeating Dinamo Tbilisi in the final. During the same year, the club also won the Georgian Super Cup; they again defeated Dinamo Tbilisi with a final score of 2–1. In the summer of 1998 Gela Shekiladze joined Belgian club K. Lierse S.K., with whom he won the 1999 Belgian Super Cup and the 44th Belgian Cup in 1999. Later, K. Lierse S.K. also awarded him with Player of the Year in 2000. In 2003–04, he joined FC Arsenal Kyiv for one season in the Ukrainian league before retiring.

Coaching Qualification and Education 

Gela Shekiladze acquired his UEFA Pro Licence in 2015. He graduated for UEFA 'B' Coaching Licence in 2006 and for UEFA 'A' Coaching Licence in 2008 in Tbilisi, Georgia. In 2012, he became the education instructor for UEFA 'B' and 'A' Coaching Licence programs, and until 2017, he organised conferences, lectures and workshops and held the official UEFA examinations in various cities across Georgia.

Coaching career

Georgia National Team 

Starting from the year 2007, Gela Shekiladze started coaching various age groups of the Georgian National Football Team. In the years 2007–2008 he was Assistant Coach to Georgian National Football Team U-21. Working alongside Petar Segrt, the Georgia U21 achieved one for the great accomplishments in the football history of the Georgian national team, with a 2:00 victory against Russia U21 in the 2007 European U21 Cup qualification. From 2008–2011, he was respectively the head coach of the Georgian National Football Teams of U-17, U-19, U-15 and U-16. For the following 5 years, he moved on to be the Sport Director and Youth Football Development Manager at Dinamo Batumi.

FC Batumi Dinamo 

In the years 2013–2017, Gela Shekiladze worked as the Sport Director and Youth Football Development Manager of FC Dinamo Batumi.

Afghanistan National Team 

In 2015–2016, Gela Shekiladze assisted Petar Segrt with coaching the Afghanistan National Football Team. Together, they won 6 out of 8 official matches; won four South Asia Cup matches and lost on against India in overtime with a final score of 1–2. In the World Cup qualification for Russia 2018, the team lost only once against Japan, having won the two other matches. This year was considered to be the most successful for Afghanistan.

Maldives National Team

In 2019–2020, Gela Shekiladze was Assistant Coach of the Maldives National Football Team.

References

External links
 (in English) New assistant coach joins the national team as practice begins for the SAFF Cup
 (in Maldivian)  Assistant Coach for the national team of Maldives
 (in English) H.E. Ambassador Dr. Fatimie Welcome the Afghan National Football Team to Japan
 (in Georgian) As a Georgian, I am very respected in Afghanistan
 (in English) Shekiladze is still remembered in Belgium
 (in Georgian) Gela Shekiladze is finally in the national team
 Player's Profile

1970 births
Living people
Soviet footballers
Footballers from Georgia (country)
Expatriate footballers from Georgia (country)
Expatriate footballers in Belgium
Expatriate footballers in Ukraine
Expatriate sportspeople from Georgia (country) in Ukraine
Lierse S.K. players
K.S.V. Roeselare players
FC Arsenal Kyiv players
FC CSKA Kyiv players
FC Dinamo Batumi players
Georgia (country) international footballers
Ukrainian Premier League players
Belgian Pro League players
Association football defenders